In mathematics, a double affine Hecke algebra, or Cherednik algebra,  is an algebra containing the Hecke algebra of an affine Weyl group, given as the quotient of the group ring of a double affine braid group. They were introduced by Cherednik, who  used them to prove Macdonald's constant term conjecture for Macdonald polynomials. Infinitesimal Cherednik algebras have significant implications in representation theory, and therefore have important applications in particle physics and in chemistry.

References

 
A. A. Kirillov Lectures on affine Hecke algebras and Macdonald's conjectures  Bull. Amer. Math. Soc. 34 (1997), 251–292.
Macdonald, I. G. Affine Hecke algebras and orthogonal polynomials. Cambridge Tracts in Mathematics, 157. Cambridge University Press, Cambridge, 2003. x+175 pp.  

Algebras
Representation theory